Edgefield is an unincorporated community in Fayette County, in the U.S. state of Ohio.

History
Edgefield derives its name from Obadiah Edge, landowner of the town site. A post office called Edgefield was established in 1877, and remained in operation until 1914. Edgefield had 46 inhabitants in 1910.

References

Unincorporated communities in Fayette County, Ohio
Unincorporated communities in Ohio